Rankinio Klubas Sporto Mokykla Garliava is a Lithuanian women's handball club from Garliava.

Since 2008 HC Garliava has played in the Lithuanian League and won it in 2010/11 season.

Titles
 Lithuanian League
2011

References

EHF profile

Zalgiris
Lithuanian Women's Handball League clubs
Garliava